Těškov is a municipality and village in Rokycany District in the Plzeň Region of the Czech Republic. It has about 300 inhabitants.

Geography
It lies in the Křivoklát Highlands.

History
The first written mention of Těškov is from 1343.

Demographics

References

External links

Villages in Rokycany District